The 2008–09 Arizona State Sun Devils men's basketball team represented Arizona State University during the 2008–09 NCAA Division I men's basketball season. The Sun Devils played their home games at the Wells Fargo Arena and are members of the Pacific-10 Conference. The Sun Devils finished with 25–10, 11–7 in Pac-10 play and lost the championship game of the 2009 Pacific-10 Conference men's basketball tournament to USC. They earned a trip to the 2009 NCAA Division I men's basketball tournament, where they lost to Syracuse in the second round.

Roster

Schedule

|-
!colspan=12 style=| Non-conference regular season

|-
!colspan=12 style=|  Pac-12 regular season

|-
!colspan=12 style=| Pac-10 tournament

|-
!colspan=12 style=| NCAA tournament

Rankings

References

Arizona State Sun Devils men's basketball seasons
Arizona State
Arizona State
Arizonia
Arizonia